Tang Weiyi is a former female table tennis player from China. In 1992 she won three medals in singles, and doubles events in the Asian Table Tennis Championships.

See also
 List of table tennis players

References

Chinese female table tennis players
Table tennis players from Shanghai
Living people
Year of birth missing (living people)